The Clarke County School District is a public school district in Clarke County, Georgia, United States, based in Athens, Georgia. It serves Clarke County, which includes the communities of Athens and Winterville, and part of Bogart.

Schools
The Clarke County School District operates fourteen elementary schools, four middle schools, and three high schools (one non-traditional).

Elementary schools
Alps Road Elementary School
Barnett Shoals Elementary School
David C. Barrow Elementary School
Chase Street Elementary School
Cleveland Road Elementary School
Fowler Drive Elementary School
Gaines Elementary School
J.J. Harris Elementary Charter School
Oglethorpe Avenue Elementary School
Howard B. Stroud Elementary School (formerly Fourth Street Elementary School)
Timothy Road Elementary School
Whit Davis Road Elementary School
Whitehead Road Elementary School
Winterville Elementary School
Maxine P. Easom Elementary School (future school)
Elementary School 'C' (unnamed future school)

Middle schools
Burney-Harris-Lyons Middle School
Clarke Middle School
W.R. Coile Middle School
Hilsman Middle School

High schools
Cedar Shoals High School
Clarke Central High School
Classic City High School

References

External links

School districts in Georgia (U.S. state)
Education in Clarke County, Georgia